is a Japanese song by Kome Kome Club released on April 8, 1990. It was included in their 1987 album Komeguny. Japan Airlines adopted the song for their television advertisement. It peaked at number one on the Oricon chart. In the Oricon yearly chart of 1990, it became the second best-selling song in Japan behind "Odoru Pompokolin." In 2007, Kome Kome Club released the remix version of the song in their album komedia.jp.

Cover versions
On April 23, 2003, Psycho le Cemu released a cover of this song.

In 2010, hip-hop unit Halcali also covered the song, reworking it into a tropical ska tune. The song was also the image theme song for Sony's Cyber-shot camera. In the same year, Debbie Gibson covered it in English in her Japan-only album Ms. Vocalist.

In 2017, duo FEMM (duo) released a cover for their album "80s/90s J-POP REVIVAL", and released it as part of the double single "卒業 / 浪漫飛行".

References

1990 singles
Oricon Weekly number-one singles
1990 songs